Lee Soo-geun (born February 10, 1975) is a South Korean comedian who has worked on a number of comedy shows on South Korean television. He began his career as a comedian on KBS Gag Concert, and is under the management of SM Culture & Contents agency.

Career
Before entering the entertainment industry, Lee worked as a recreational instructor, and entered a singing contest on MBC's River Music Festival (강변가요제). He was also an aerobics instructor. In October 2006, he began his own online internet shopping mall, selling clothes. In May 2008, he became an ambassador for the Pork Management Committee (양돈 자조금 관리위원회 홍보대사)

Lee has appeared on many reality-variety shows. He made a breakthrough in his career after appearing on KBS' Happy Sunday: 1 Night 2 Days. He was seen as the most hardworking member of the cast and was in charge of driving in the show, as he had a commercial coach license. After appearing on the show, he earned more recognition and was offered MC roles on other shows, such as season 2 of Sang Sang Plus, his first TV appearance in the role of an MC. His marriage was broadcast on national television on 1 Night 2 Days.

Up until 2012, he was signed under Castle J Entertainment, and on September 19, it was announced that he had signed exclusive contracts with SM C&C, a subsidiary of SM Entertainment, along with Kim Byung-man, immediately after fellow national MC Kang Ho-dong and Shin Dong-yup joined.

In December 2015, he reunited with Kang Ho-dong as a cast member for JTBC's new variety show, Knowing Bros.

In 2017, Lee Soo-geun appeared in more than ten programs over the course of a year and showed his unique charm in various programs.

Personal life
Lee married Park Ji-yeon in 2008. They have 2 sons from their marriage, Lee Tae-joon and Lee Tae-seo. Lee's mother is a shaman.

He is a Taekwondo black belt (he is currently a 5th dan black belt in Taekwondo and has demonstrated his skills on various variety shows such as Guesthouse Daughters and Knowing Bros).

Controversies
In 2013, Lee was under the investigation for suspicion of online illegal gambling along with Tony An, Tak Jae-hoon, Andy Lee & Boom. Lee was involved in an illegal sports gambling scandal, in which he placed bets on the results of top division football teams in the United Kingdom by using an illegal online gambling website and cell phone text messages. Lee has claimed to have bet billions of Korean won on online sports betting websites. As a result of researching his gambling activities, Lee Soo-geun was found to have gambled using  from December 2008 to June 2011.
In the first public trial on the morning of December 6, 2013, Judge Shin Myung-hee of the Seoul Central Prosecutor's Office charged Lee Soo Geun with eight months in prison and two years of probation. Lee Soo Geun, who appeared in the first public trial with his lawyer, repeatedly acknowledged his crime and begged for mercy. After two years of self-restraint time at home, he returned with billiards competition show "Juk-bang Legend". Before filming the first episode of the show, Lee said "I will restart as if it is my first time."

Discography
 2020: "SWAG" (ft. Chin Chilla and Jiselle) - Show Me The Play 2 Final
 2019: "White Winter" (with. Kim Hee-chul) - STATION X 4 LOVEs for Winter Part.3
 2010: "Huk" (ft. Eun Jiwon)
 2009: "Happy Song" (ft. Ez-Life)
 2009: "Let's Keep Going Until the End" (ft. Eun Jiwon)

Filmography

Awards

Listicles

References

External links
 

1975 births
Living people
Gag Concert
South Korean Buddhists
South Korean comedians
South Korean male film actors
South Korean male taekwondo practitioners
South Korean television personalities
Best Variety Performer Male Paeksang Arts Award (television) winners